Kaboom is an onomatopoeic term representing the sound of an explosion. It may also refer to:

Film and television 
 Kaboom (film), 2010 film directed by Gregg Araki
 "Kaboom" (Parks and Recreation), episode of Parks and Recreation

Books 
 Kaboom (book), Iraq War memoir by Matt Gallagher (2010)

Theatre 
 Ka-Boom!, off-Broadway musical (1980)

Music 
 Kaboom! (album), album by I Fight Dragons
 KFOG KaBoom, yearly concert in San Francisco sponsored by KFOG
 "Kaboom",  unreleased song co-written by Lady Gaga (2008)

Video games 
 Kaboom! (video game), Atari 2600 video game
 Kaboom: The Suicide Bombing Game (also known as Kaboom!), flash game

Food 
 Kaboom (breakfast cereal), produced by General Mills

Organisations 
KaBOOM! (non-profit organization), a U.S. non-profit organization that helps communities build local play-spaces for children
KaBOOM! (publisher), a U.S. comics publisher
Kaboom Studios

College mascot 
 Kaboom, the mascot of the Bradley University Braves

Other uses 
 Kaboom, bathroom tile cleaner manufactured by Church and Dwight
 KaBoom (candy), the original name under which the candy Wonka Xploder was released under in the U.S. in 2000 and UK in 2002
 KaBOOM Ka-Band Objects Observation and Monitoring System, NASA system for detecting and tracking near-Earth objects